Joseph Gaertner (12 March 1732 – 14 July 1791) was a German botanist, best known for his work on seeds, De Fructibus et Seminibus Plantarum (1788-1792).

Biography
He was born in Calw, and studied in Göttingen under Albrecht von Haller. He was primarily a naturalist, but also worked at physics and zoology. He travelled extensively to visit other naturalists. He was professor of anatomy in Tübingen in 1760, and was appointed professor of botany at St Petersburg in 1768, but returned to Calw in 1770.
Gaertner  made back cross to convert one species into another. Back cross increases nuclear  gene frequency    
His observations were: 
1.	Dominance of traits 
2.	Equal contribution of male and female to the progeny 
3.	No  variation in F1 (first generation of descendants)
4.	Large variation in F2 (second generation of descendants) including parental and intermediate types 
5.	Some of F2 plants  had entirely new traits 
but he was unable to give possible explanation for observed data but which was brilliantly done by Mendel

Julius Sachs writes

De Fructibus
By 1770 he had already begun work on his De Fructibus et Seminibus Plantarum, but thereafter he gave himself up almost entirely to it, becoming nearly blind through his persistent studies, partly with the microscope. The work's minutely accurate descriptions, comprising a thousand and more species, introduced a new era in plant morphology. The scientific value of the book was much increased by the addition of 180 copper-plate engravings.

The genus of plants Gaertnera in Rubiaceae was named after him.

References 

1732 births
1791 deaths
People from Calw
Botanists with author abbreviations
18th-century German botanists
German mycologists
Fellows of the Royal Society
Full members of the Saint Petersburg Academy of Sciences
Honorary members of the Saint Petersburg Academy of Sciences